Her Man o' War is a 1926 American silent war drama film directed by Frank Urson and starring Jetta Goudal, William Boyd and Jimmie Adams.

The film's sets were designed by the art director Max Parker.

Synopsis
After being captured during World War I, an American prisoner is sent to work on a small farm run by a young woman.

Cast
 Jetta Goudal as Cherie Schultz 
 William Boyd as Jim Sanderson 
 Jimmie Adams as Shorty Flynn 
 Grace Darmond as Countess of Lederbon 
 Kay Deslys as Big Bertha 
 Frank Reicher as Prof. Krantz 
 Michael Vavitch as Col. Prittwitz 
 Robert Edeson as Field Marshall 
 Frank Coghlan Jr. as Peterkin Schultz

References

Bibliography
 Goble, Alan. The Complete Index to Literary Sources in Film. Walter de Gruyter, 1999.

External links
 

1926 films
1920s war drama films
American silent feature films
American war drama films
Films directed by Frank Urson
American black-and-white films
Producers Distributing Corporation films
American World War I films
1926 drama films
1920s English-language films
1920s American films
Silent American drama films
Silent war drama films